The Church of St Anselm and St Cecilia is a Roman Catholic church at 310 Kingsway, Holborn, London.

It was built in about 1909, designed by Frederick Walters to replace the Sardinian Embassy Chapel which was demolished in order to make way for Kingsway. The church has been Grade II listed since 1974. The south aisle was added in about 1953, designed by Stanley Kerr Bate, and the facade was rebuilt at that time.

References

External links
 
 

Grade II listed churches in London
Roman Catholic churches in the London Borough of Camden
Frederick Walters buildings
Grade II listed buildings in the London Borough of Camden